Franca Schamber (born December 10, 1998) is a German female acrobatic gymnast. With partners Luise Zscheile and Nora Schaefer, Schamber competed in the 2014 Acrobatic Gymnastics World Championships.

References

1998 births
Living people
German acrobatic gymnasts
Female acrobatic gymnasts